The 1900 Baylor football team was an American football team that represented Baylor University as an independent during the 1900 college football season. This was the second football season for Baylor. Under head coach R. H. Hamilton, the team played all of its games at home in Waco, Texas, and finished the season undefeated at 3–0.

Schedule

References

Baylor
Baylor Bears football seasons
Baylor football